Nicholson is a small town in East Gippsland, Victoria, Australia, 295 km east of the state capital Melbourne. It is situated between the larger towns of Bairnsdale and Lakes Entrance. At the 2006 census, Nicholson and surrounds had a population of 1,504.

Nicholson is located on the Princes Highway and lies on the banks of the Nicholson River.

Nicholson Post Office opened on 1 August 1885.

The town has a substantial boat ramp on the west bank of the river, to the south of the highway, where picnic, toilet, and barbecue facilities are also available.

The East Gippsland Rail Trail passes across the north section of the town, with the site of the former Nicholson Railway Station identified by a sign.

References

Towns in Victoria (Australia)
Shire of East Gippsland